Proglution is the 3rd full album released by Japanese rock band Uverworld as well as being the follow-up to their second album, Bugright. The album was released January 16, 2008.

The album entered the Oricon charts 15 times and its peak ranking was at 3rd. The album was certified gold by the Recording Industry Association of Japan. At the same time of their album's certification, their single, Ukiyo Crossing was also certified gold.

The title of their album is a combination of the words "progenitor" and "revolution".

Track listing

References

External links
 [ Review of album at Allmusic]

2007 albums
Uverworld albums
Gr8! Records albums
Japanese-language albums